Kobe Montrell Jones (born May 18, 1998) is an American football linebacker for the Carolina Panthers of the National Football League (NFL). He played college football at Mississippi State, and originally signed with the Atlanta Falcons as an undrafted free agent in 2021. He has also played for the Miami Dolphins and the Tennessee Titans.

Personal life and high school
Kobe Jones was born on May 18, 1998, to Telesia and Melvin Jones. Jones attended Starkville High School where he helped lead them to the state championship for their region and as a result of his contributions was selected to be in the Mississippi-Alabama All-Star game.

College career
Rated as a four-star recruit by ESPN, Jones chose to stay close to home and attend Mississippi State University, also located in Starkville, Mississippi. Jones chose to redshirt his freshman year and did not play as a true freshman. In Jones' redshirt freshman season, he appeared in all thirteen games and recorded his first sack in the last game of the season for Mississippi State, the 2017 TaxSlayer Bowl against Louisville. The next year, Jones again appeared in thirteen games and recorded his first start against LSU. In his Junior year, Jones would again appear in thirteen games and start one game, and additionally would be second on the team in sacks with four. In his senior and shortened year due to the Covid-19 pandemic, Jones would start eleven games and be named to the SEC Community Service Team.

Professional career

Atlanta Falcons
After going undrafted in the 2021 NFL Draft, Jones was signed as an undrafted free agent by the Atlanta Falcons. Jones was released before the regular season started to shorten the Falcons roster to the 53 man limit.

Miami Dolphins
Jones was briefly a member of the Miami Dolphins, being signed to the practice squad on November 17th and being waived on November 29th.

Tennessee Titans
Jones was signed to a reserve/future contract by the Tennessee Titans in January of 2022 but was later released on May 2, 2022 along with three other players.

Green Bay Packers
After being released from the Titans roster, on May 9, 2022, Jones was once again signed to a practice squad, this time to the Green Bay Packers. After more than a year in the NFL, Jones was elevated to an active roster spot during the regular season for the Packers' week 8 game against the Buffalo Bills. He was released on November 1, 2022.

Carolina Panthers
On November 7, 2022, Jones signed with the Carolina Panthers practice squad. He signed a reserve/future contract on January 9, 2023.

References

External links
Mississippi State Bulldogs bio

1998 births
Living people
American football linebackers
Sportspeople from Starkville, Mississippi
Mississippi State Bulldogs football players
Atlanta Falcons players
Miami Dolphins players
Tennessee Titans players
Green Bay Packers players
Carolina Panthers players